Ronald Klink (born September 23, 1951) is an American television broadcaster and politician and who served four terms as a United States Representative from Pennsylvania from 1993 to 2001, as member of the Democratic Party.

Early life and career

Klink was born in Canton, Ohio, and graduated from Meyersdale High School in Pennsylvania in 1969.

Broadcasting career
Klink originally worked behind the scenes at WTAJ-TV in Altoona, Pennsylvania from 1976 to 1977 and then became weatherman plus fill-in sports anchor until his departure for Pittsburgh in July 1978. He later became a recognizable figure in the Pittsburgh area as a television news weatherman and reporter on KDKA-TV from 1978 to 1991.

Congress
In 1992, Klink sought the Democratic nomination for the 4th District and defeated five-term incumbent Joe Kolter in the primary.  He was easily elected in November and served four terms in the House, never winning less than 64 percent of the vote. Klink was popular within his district as a moderate Democrat with strong labor ties.

2000 Senate campaign
In 2000, he left his House seat to run unsuccessfully for the Senate against incumbent Rick Santorum. Klink lost the race by five points. Klink was virtually unknown on the eastern side of Pennsylvania (including the important Philadelphia area). Other contributing factors included his conservative stances on social issues and the fact that he had to spend a large amount of money in the crowded Democratic primary.

After Congress
He had been mentioned as a possible candidate for his own congressional seat against the person who succeeded him, Republican Melissa Hart. However, in December 2005, Klink announced he would not run.

According to then-Congressman Curt Weldon in his book Countdown to Terror, in 2003, Klink offered Weldon the identity of an intelligence source with information on Iraqi uranium purchases. The agent was thought to be Iranian arms dealer Manucher Ghorbanifar. The intelligence reportedly later proved to be fabricated.

Electoral history

*Write-in and minor candidate notes:  In 1994, write-ins received 6 votes.  In 1996, write-ins received 98 votes.  In 1998, write-ins received 17 votes.

See also
2000 United States Senate election in Pennsylvania

References

External links

Voting record maintained by the Washington Post

 

1951 births
Living people
American television journalists
Politicians from Canton, Ohio
KDKA people
Democratic Party members of the United States House of Representatives from Pennsylvania
American male journalists
Journalists from Ohio